Petton is a small village and civil parish in Shropshire, England. It was mentioned in Domesday as "Peetone", a name probably derived from Old English paec-tun, "settlement by the hill".

Petton is near to the village and parish of Cockshutt, south-east of the town Ellesmere. The two parishes have in recent years combined their parish councils under the name Cockshutt-cum-Petton.

See also
Listed buildings in Petton

References

Civil parishes in Shropshire
Villages in Shropshire